Farley Vieira Rosa (born 14 January 1994) is a Brazilian professional footballer who plays as a left winger for Tianjin Jinmen Tiger.

Club career
Farley Rosa is a product of the Sporting Clube de Portugal youth sportive school system. In July 2013 he signed a contract with the Ukrainian Premier League club FC Sevastopol. On 9 July 2016, Greek Superleague club Panetolikos officially announced the signing of Rosa on a two-year contract. Despite coming usually as a substitute he finished the 2016–17 season having recorded five goals and six assists. He began the next season with some fluctuations in his performances, but after some time he became a very important part in the team's plans. On 26 November 2017, he sealed an anxious 3–1 home win against AEL, which was the first since matchday 6.

References

External links
 
 

1994 births
Living people
Brazilian footballers
Association football wingers
FC Sevastopol players
Apollon Limassol FC players
AEK Larnaca FC players
Panetolikos F.C. players
Ettifaq FC players
Atromitos F.C. players
Fujairah FC players
Hapoel Be'er Sheva F.C. players
Hapoel Tel Aviv F.C. players
Tianjin Jinmen Tiger F.C. players
Ukrainian Premier League players
Cypriot First Division players
Super League Greece players
Saudi Professional League players
UAE Pro League players
Israeli Premier League players
Chinese Super League players
Brazilian expatriate footballers
Expatriate footballers in Ukraine
Expatriate footballers in Cyprus
Expatriate footballers in Greece
Expatriate footballers in Saudi Arabia
Expatriate footballers in the United Arab Emirates
Expatriate footballers in Israel
Expatriate footballers in China
Brazilian expatriate sportspeople in Ukraine
Brazilian expatriate sportspeople in Cyprus
Brazilian expatriate sportspeople in Greece
Brazilian expatriate sportspeople in Saudi Arabia
Brazilian expatriate sportspeople in the United Arab Emirates
Brazilian expatriate sportspeople in Israel
Brazilian expatriate sportspeople in China